Kunhing Townshipis a township of Loilen District in the Shan State of Myanmar. The principal town is Kunhing.

References 

Townships of Shan State
Loilen District